Airville is an unincorporated community in York County, Pennsylvania, United States. Airville is located in the southeastern part of the county where Pennsylvania Route 74 and Pennsylvania Route 425 intersect and is about 4 miles outside Woodbine.

Airville has an estimated population of 3100 and includes residents from Lower Chanceford, Peach Bottom, and Fawn townships.  The Susquehanna River separates Airville from Lancaster County on its eastern side.  Travelers can cross the river via the Norman Wood Bridge along Pennsylvania Route 372, which connects to Quarryville in Lancaster County.

Attractions in Airville include Mill Creek Falls Retreat, the Otter Creek Campground and the historical Indian Steps Museum, which are located along Pennsylvania Route 425 and the Susquehanna River.  Otter Creek was mentioned in the band Live's song, "The Dam at Otter Creek."  Remnants of the Maryland and Pennsylvania Railroad are also scattered throughout Airville, along Muddy Creek.

See also
Muddy Creek Forks Historic District

References

Unincorporated communities in York County, Pennsylvania
Unincorporated communities in Pennsylvania